Prof. Dr. Datuk  Mohamed Mackeen bin Abdul Majid (11 June 1928 – 12 October 2013) was a prominent scholar, professor of Islamic Studies. He worked at the Kulliyah of Islamic Revealed Knowledge and Human Sciences at the International Islamic University of Malaysia and University of Malaya.

Awards 
He received Panglima Jasa Negara (PJN) award which carries the title Datuk from the King of Malaysia Tuanku Mizan Zainal Abidin on the occasion of The Yang di-Pertuan Agong's birthday in 2009.

Selected publications 
 Islamic Thought in the Modern World: The Need for an Integrated Approach in Islam: source and purpose of knowledge, IIIT.
 Some thoughts on the meaning of "Following the Sunnah" (1979)

References 

20th-century Muslim scholars of Islam
Malaysian Sufi religious leaders
1928 births
2013 deaths
Commanders of the Order of Meritorious Service
Academic staff of the International Islamic University Malaysia
Academic staff of the University of Malaya